David Crenshaw "Uncle Dave" Barrow Jr. (October 18, 1852 – January 11, 1929) served as chancellor of the University of Georgia (UGA) in Athens from 1906 until his resignation in 1925 (The head of the university was referred to as chancellor instead of president from 1860 until 1932).

Early life and education
Barrow was born in Wolfskin District, Oglethorpe County, Georgia, on October 18, 1852. His father was David C. Barrow Sr., a planter and a trustee at the university, and his mother was Sarah Pope Barrow. He married Frances Ingle Childs of Athens in 1879, and they had four children and ten grandchildren. One of his sons, David Francis Barrow, became a member of the UGA Mathematics faculty.

Barrow was educated at the University of Georgia, receiving both a B.S. and a degree in engineering (C & M.E.), class of 1874, where he was a member of the Chi Phi Fraternity. After trying the law and geological surveying, he became an Adjunct Professor of Mathematics at the university in 1878. His additional responsibilities included Professor of Civil Engineering (1883), Head of the combined Department of Mathematics and Civil Engineering, Head of Pure Mathematics, and Dean of the Franklin College in 1899. He became the acting chancellor upon then-Chancellor Hill's death (1905). He was subsequently officially named Chancellor in 1906.

University of Georgia
At the time of his appointment as chancellor, the University of Georgia could be accurately described as a collection of colleges, consisting of a liberal arts college, a law school, a summer school, beginning schools of pharmacy and forestry, an embryonic college of agriculture, and some graduate courses in various fields.

When Barrow retired in 1925, the university had become a modern institution. The more established college of agriculture and a structured graduate school existed. In addition, the following schools were created during his tenure: school of education (1908), commerce (1912) (currently known as the Terry College of Business), and journalism (1915). Beginning in 1903, female students were admitted for the first time as summer students and were later enrolled as graduate students (1916) and finally undergraduates (1918).

Regular enrollment had almost quadrupled (from 408 in his inaugural year to 1,592 at the end of his tenure) because of Barrow's efforts and the admission of female students. Faculty size had tripled, state funding had increased greatly (from $22,500 in 1906 to $145,000 in 1925), alumni fundraising was increased, and several new buildings had been constructed on campus including: Conner Hall (1908), Peabody Hall (1913), Barrow Hall (1916), Soule Hall (1920), Hardman Hall (1922), Milledge Hall (1925) and Memorial Hall (1925).

Upon his resignation, Barrow was elected as a Chancellor Emeritus for life by the Georgia Board of Regents.

Later years
Barrow was often called upon for public service outside of his university duties. In 1907, at the request of Booker T. Washington, Barrow served on the board of the Jeanes Fund for the improvement of rural education for African Americans.

He also served as the neutral arbitrator in the Central of Georgia Railway strike in 1909. After black workers were hired to work alongside whites, white employees of the railroad, who were represented by the Brotherhood of Locomotive Firemen and Enginemen, called a strike. The black employees received a lower wage than their white counterparts. The issue was settled by a federal board of arbitration, which ruled that black workers should be paid equal pay for equal work. Barrow's vote thus led to the retention of black firemen at equal pay with whites.

Chancellor Barrow died in 1929 at his home in Athens. Funeral services were held in the Chapel on UGA's north campus, and he was buried in Oconee Hill Cemetery in Athens. Barrow County, Georgia an Athens elementary school, an Athens street, Barrow Hall at the university and the David C. Barrow Chair of Mathematics all honor the late Chancellor.

Notes

References
History of the University of Georgia, Thomas Walter Reed, Imprint: Athens, Georgia : University of Georgia, ca. 1949
From Ahmedunggar to Lavonia Presidents at the University of Georgia 1785–1997, University of Georgia Libraries, Hargrett Rare Book and Manuscript Library
UGA Department of Mathematics History
The New Georgia Encyclopedia entry for David C. Barrow

1852 births
1929 deaths
Presidents of the University of Georgia
University of Georgia alumni
People from Oglethorpe County, Georgia
19th-century American mathematicians
20th-century American mathematicians